The Last Dance is the second compilation album from pop group Steps, and was released eleven months after the group had disbanded. It contains a selection of B-sides and remixes of previous singles and received extremely limited promotion prior to its release. The album reached #57 in the UK. A 49 track edition is currently available digitally.

Track listing

 5,6,7,8 [W.I.P. 2002 Remix] (Upton/Crosby) – 5:26
 Tragedy [W.I.P. Reception Mix] (Gibb/Gibb/Gibb) – 6:57
 Last Thing on My Mind [Wip't Up In The Disco Mix] (Stock/Waterman/Dallin/Woodward) – 5:39
 One for Sorrow [W.I.P. Mix] (Topham/Twigg/Ellington) – 6:53
 Better Best Forgotten [W.I.P. '99 Cream of Manchester Mix] (Frampton/Waterman) – 6:16
 Love's Got a Hold on My Heart [W.I.P. Off The Wall Mix] (Frampton/Waterman) – 6:12
 After The Love Has Gone [W.I.P. Mix] (Topham/Twigg/Ellington) – 4:35
 Deeper Shade of Blue [W.I.P. Mix] (Topham/Twigg) – 6:47
 Summer Of Love [W.I.P. Remix] (Topham/Twigg) – 6:38
 Stomp [W.I.P. Mix] (Topham/Twigg/Campbell/Edwards/Rodgers) – 6:08

 W.I.P. = Work In Progress

A new version has been released digitally on 27 February 2020, now containing 49 tracks.

 Overture – 4:20
 Just Like The First Time – 3:28
 One For Sorrow (Tony Moran Remix) – 3:29
 Human Touch – 3:56
 Too Busy Thinking About My Baby – 2:49
 You'll Be Sorry (The W.I.P. Radio Mix) – 4:08
 To Be Your Hero – 3:48
 Baby Don't Dance (W.I.P. Radio Edit) – 3:51
 Lay All Your Love On Me – 4:25
 Mars & Venus (We Fall In Love Again) – 3:51
 Stomp (Dance Man's Cosmic Funk Mix) – 4:29
 In It For Love – 3:23
 Summer Of Love (D-Bop's Tequila Sunrise Vocal Mix) – 6:51
 A Love To Last – 3:41
 Better Best Forgotten (Nip On The Dance Floor W.I.P. Mix) – 5:19
 Bittersweet – 3:58
 Here And Now (Almighty Edit) – 4:07
 Words Of Wisdom – 3:52
 Deeper Shade Of Blue (Sleazesisters Anthem PA Edit) – 4:00
 Stop Me From Loving You – 3:42
 5, 6, 7, 8 (W.I.P. 2002 Remix) – 5:25
 Why? – 4:09
 Merry Xmas everybody – 3:08
 Chain Reaction (Graham Stack Extended Mix) – 6:26

 5, 6, 7, 8 (Euro Step Mix)
 Last Thing On My Mind (Wip't Up The Disco Mix) – 5:39
 One For Sorrow (Sleazesisters Anthem Mix) –  4:12
 Tragedy (W.I.P. Reception Mix) – 6:57
 Heatbeat (Simon Hill Mix) – 4:38
 Better Best Forgotten (W.I.P. '99 Cream Of Manchester Mix) – 6:15
 Love's Got A Hold On My Heart (W.I.P. Off The Wall Mix) – 6:11
 After The Love Has Gone (W.I.P. Mix) – 5:36
 Say You'll Be Mine (Matt Pop's Old Skool Mix) – 5:29
 Better The Devil You Know (2T's 2 Go Mix) – 5:41
 Deeper Shade Of Blue (W.I.P. Mix) – 6:46
 Summer Of Love (W.I.P. Mix) – 6:40
 Stomp (W.I.P. Mix) – 6:07
 It's The Way You Make Me Feel (Sleazesisters Anthem Edit) – 3:24
 Here And Now (Sleazesisters Anthem Edit) – 3:31
 You'll Be Sorry (W.I.P. Bach To Classics Mix) – 6:48
 Chain Reaction (Almighty Mix) – 8:13
 Words Are Not Enough (Sleazesisters Anthem Edit) – 5:06
 I Know Him So Well (Almighty Mix) – 7:15
 One For Sorrow (W.I.P. Remix) – 6:52
 Just Like The First Time (W.I.P. Remix) – 3:42
 Chain Reaction (Xenomania Edit) – 4:16
 Human Touch (W.I.P. Remix) – 3:57
 You'll Be Sorry (Sleazesisters Anthem Mix) – 8:07
 One For Sorrow (Soul Solution Extended Vocal Mix) – 5:05

Charts and certifications

Charts

Certifications

References

Steps (group) albums
B-side compilation albums
2002 remix albums
2002 compilation albums
Jive Records compilation albums
Jive Records remix albums